Rupnarayan Roy was a  veteran communist and peasant leader of undivided Bengal and then Bangladesh. One of the three first communist legislators who were elected to the Bengal Legislative Assembly in 1946. He died a martyr, some miscreants entered his house, called him from his bed at night and beheaded him.

About
A marxist revolutionary, one of the top organizers of Tebhaga Movement, leader of anti-British movement, MLA of undivided Bengal, organizer of CPB-NAP-BSU led guerrilla force in the Bangladesh Liberation War.

References

1908 births
1974 deaths